The 1855 Liverpool by-election was held on 29 March 1855 after the incumbent Conservative MP Henry Liddell succeeded to the peerage as Baron Ravensworth.  The election was won by the Whig candidate Joseph Christopher Ewart.

References

1855 elections in the United Kingdom
Liverpoool, 1855
1855 in England
1850s in Liverpool